Harpalus davidianus is a species of ground beetle in the subfamily Harpalinae. It was described by Tschitscherine in 1903.

References

davidianus
Beetles described in 1903